Mill Avenue/3rd Street (also known as  Downtown Tempe/Town Lake) is a station on the Valley Metro Rail light rail line in Tempe, Arizona, United States. 

As of the opening of the Tempe Streetcar line on May 20, 2022, it serves as one of two transit stations from the Valley Metro line to the Streetcar.

Ridership

Notable places nearby
 Tempe Town Lake
 Tempe Depot
 Tempe Center for the Arts
 Tempe Butte / A Mountain

References

External links
 Valley Metro map

Valley Metro Rail stations
Transportation in Tempe, Arizona
Railway stations in the United States opened in 2008
2008 establishments in Arizona
Buildings and structures in Tempe, Arizona